"Manshū Musume" (lit. Manchurian Girl) is a Japanese hit song in 1938. Lyrics is by Akiji Ishimatsu and Music is by Tetsuo Suzuki.

References 

Japanese-language songs
1938 songs